Herbert Evelyn Curtis (1818–1890) was a 19th-century Member of Parliament in Nelson, New Zealand.

References

|-

1818 births
1890 deaths
Members of the New Zealand House of Representatives
New Zealand MPs for South Island electorates
People from Motueka
19th-century New Zealand politicians